Wehmig is a small river of Bavaria, Germany. It is the left headwater of the Weibersbach in Albstadt.

See also
List of rivers of Bavaria

Rivers of Bavaria
Rivers of Germany